Woodhull is an unincorporated community located in the town of Lamartine, Fond du Lac County, Wisconsin, United States.

Location
Woodhull is located at the junction of County Road Y and Forest Ave. Our Risen Savior Catholic Church is located on the south eastern corner of the intersection. There is one bar, and a few houses throughout the remainder of the community.

History
A post office called Woodhull was established in 1864, and remained in operation until it was discontinued in 1904. The community was named for Nathaniel Woodhull, a military general in the American Revolutionary War or possibly for John Woodhull, the deputy postmaster at Fond du Lac, Wisconsin at the time.

Images

References

Unincorporated communities in Fond du Lac County, Wisconsin
Unincorporated communities in Wisconsin